Allu Arjun is an Indian actor who primarily appears in Telugu films. In 1985, at the age of three, he made his debut in the film Vijetha, directed by A. Kodandarami Reddy. Sixteen years later, Arjun made a small appearance  as Gopi, a dancer, in the 2001 film Daddy directed by Suresh Krissna. He had his first leading role in the 2003 film Gangotri, directed by K. Raghavendra Rao which was the latter's hundredth film as a director. In the film, Arjun played an adolescent named Simhadri living in Rayalaseema, who falls in love with a factionist's daughter.

Arjun played the role of a college student in two films  Sukumar directorial debut Arya, and V. V. Vinayak Bunny. His role in the former was his breakthrough, earning him his first Nandi Special Jury Award. Arjun collaborated with A. Karunakaran on the film Happy, in which he played a villager completing his graduation in Hyderabad while working part-time as a pizza delivery boy. The film was a commercial success with its dubbed version becoming an all time blockbuster in Kerala. Arjun later collaborated with Puri Jagannadh on the film Desamuduru, in which he played the role of a crime reporter working for MAA TV. For the role, Arjun sported a long hairdo and worked out to develop sculpted abdominal muscles. Desamuduru received positive reviews from critics and became a commercial success, establishing him as an action hero. He received his second Filmfare Best Telugu Actor Award nomination for the same, he won CineMAA Awards for Best Actor Jury. In the same year he also made a cameo appearance in the film Shankar Dada Zindabad, directed by Prabhu Deva.

In 2008, Arjun starred in Bhaskar Parugu. For his role, Arjun had to shed weight and maintain a short hair style in order to appear like a common middle class man. Upon release, Parugu received mixed reviews from critics, but was a commercial success. Arjun earned his first Filmfare Best Telugu Actor Award, two CineMAA Awards for Best Actor and Best Actor Jury and his second Nandi Special Jury Award.  In 2009, Arjun played the role of Arya, a behaviourally sick orphan consumed with possessiveness for his friends who never accept him, in Sukumar's Arya 2, a sequel to their previous collaboration, Arya. Albeit receiving mixed reviews from critics, Arya 2 became one of the few commercially successful Telugu films of 2009. Arjun's first release of 2010 was Gunasekhar Varudu, which was based on Indian marriage rituals and systems. His other release that year was Krish hyperlink film, Vedam, in which he played "Cable" Raju, a cable operator. While Varudu was considered a flop, Vedam received critical acclaim and earned Arjun his second Filmfare Best Telugu Actor Award. In 2011, Arjun collaborated with V. V. Vinayak for the second time on Badrinath, in which he played an Indian samurai living in a Badrinath Temple in the Himalayas; for the role he trained in martial arts for three months in Vietnam under Peter Hein. The film received negative reviews from critics but performed well at the box office.

In 2012, Arjun played the primary eye witness of a 1500 crore bank robbery, who fakes his death and leaves the city as a part of witness protection in Trivikram Srinivas' Julai. The film was one of the five highest-grossing Telugu films of 2012. His next film, Iddarammayilatho, directed by Puri Jagannadh, received positive to mixed reviews from critics, and it was declared hit at the box office. In 2014, Arjun made a crucial cameo appearance in the commercially successful film Yevadu, directed by Vamsi Paidipally, for which he won critical acclaim. His next release in 2014 was Race Gurram, directed by Surender Reddy, which became the highest grossing Telugu film of the year and the fourth highest-grossing Telugu film of all time. He then produced and acted in a short film titled I Am That Change, directed by Sukumar, which was based on the theme of anti-corruption. His first release of 2015, S/O Satyamurthy directed by Trivikram Srinivas, opened to decent feedback from critics. His first release of 2016, Sarrainodu directed by Boyapati Srinu, opened to mixed to positive reviews from critics. With this film, Allu Arjun has scored his third consecutive blockbuster film during summer after Race Gurram and S/0 Satyamurthy. His next release was Duvvada Jagannadham directed by Harish Shankar. It received generally mixed to positive reviews from critics but went on to become one of the biggest hits of 2017. In 2018, Allu Arjun had played the role of an aggressive soldier in Naa Peru Surya, Naa Illu India, directed by Vakkantham Vamsi. His 2020 Trivikram-directed action drama Ala Vaikunthapurramuloo became one of highest-grossing Telugu films.

In 2021, Allu re-united with director Sukumar for Pushpa: The Rise - Part 01 in their third collaboration after the Arya series. Allu stars as the titular character Pushpa Raj where a plays a coolie-turned-sandalwood smuggler. Its first installment, titled Pushpa: The Rise - Part 01 released in December 2021 while the second installment Pushpa 2: The Rule is scheduled to release in 2024. Following this, Allu is committed to team up with director Sandeep Reddy Vanga for their next project, tentatively titled AA22.

Films

Music video

See also 
 List of awards and nominations received by Allu Arjun

Notes

References

External links 

 

Indian filmographies
Male actor filmographies